Symphyotrichum nahanniense (formerly Aster nahanniensis) is a species of flowering plant in the family Asteraceae endemic to Northwest Territories, Canada. Its flowers have white to pale rose, often becoming rose-violet, ray florets and yellow then reddish disk florets. 

The species grows only within Nahanni National Park Reserve and has been found at seven hot mineral springs locations within the Park. A survey conducted in 2019 recorded about 130,000 plants.

Citations

References

nahanniense
Flora of the Northwest Territories
Plants described in 1974
Taxa named by William James Cody
Endemic flora of Canada